Michael G. Curcio (born November 15, 1982) is an American politician from the state of Tennessee. A Republican, Curcio has represented the 69th district of the Tennessee House of Representatives, based in Columbia and Dickson, since 2017.

Career
In 2014, Curcio ran for the 69th district of the Tennessee House of Representatives against Democratic incumbent David Shepard. After a heated race, Curcio lost to Shepard by 16 votes, 50.1-49.9%.

Curcio soon a declared a second campaign for the seat in 2016, while Shepard announced he would retire. This time, Curcio defeated two primary challengers before easily winning the general election over Democrat Dustin Evans and flipping the seat to Republicans.

Curcio ran to replace Cameron Sexton as Majority Caucus Chairman in 2019, but ultimately lost to fellow Republican representative Jeremy Faison.

Personal life
Curcio lives in Dickson with his wife, Mary Katherine, and their three children.

References

Living people
Republican Party members of the Tennessee House of Representatives
21st-century American politicians
1982 births
University of Mississippi alumni
People from Dickson, Tennessee